Abdul Qadir (14 June 1905, Pabaini Swabi - 22 October 1969) was a Pakistani Islamic scholar, academician and founder of Pashto Academy and Department of Pashto, University of Peshawar.

Education 
Abdul Qadir got his matriculation, intermediate and graduation from Islamia College Peshawar in 1927, and masters in English (1929), Arabic (1930), LLB (1931) and BT (1932) from Aligarh Muslim University.

Career
Qadri started his career in 1942 as an editor of a Pashto magazine "Nan Paron" (Today, Yesterday) then he was appointed in charge of the Pashto section (Middle East) by Patras Bokhari (then director-general) of All India Radio. In the early 50s, he was made Vice-Counsel and then ambassador in Kabul, Afghanistan from Pakistan. From University Library of Tübingen Germany, he discovered "Khairul Bayan" in 1967 (rare manuscript written by Pir Roshan) the first prose book in Pashto.

Death
Qadri died on 22 October 1969 during a seminar at Rajshahi in East Pakistan (modern day Bangladesh). He is buried in Peshawar, Pakistan.

References 

1905 births
1969 deaths
People from Swabi District
Islamia College University alumni
Aligarh Muslim University alumni
All India Radio people
Ambassadors of Pakistan to Afghanistan
Academic staff of the University of Peshawar
Pashto-language literature